Liberty Township is one of ten townships in Cape Girardeau County, Missouri, USA.  As of the 2000 census, its population was 483.

Liberty Township was established in 1848, and named for the American principle of liberty.

Geography
It contains eight cemeteries: Borneman, Crump, Passover, Proffer, Proffer, Spivey, Stoder and Stroderville.

The streams of Gizzard Creek and Hog Creek run through this township.

References

 USGS Geographic Names Information System (GNIS)

External links
 US-Counties.com
 City-Data.com

Townships in Cape Girardeau County, Missouri
Cape Girardeau–Jackson metropolitan area
Townships in Missouri